Marquis Li of Jin, ancestral name Ji (姬), given name Fu (福), was the fifth ruler of the state of Jin during the Western Zhou Dynasty. After his father, Marquis Cheng of Jin, died, he ascended the throne of Jin. After he died in 859 BC, his son, Yijiu, ascended the throne as the next ruler of Jin: Marquis Jing of Jin.

In 1992, an ancient tomb dating back to the Zhou Dynasty was discovered in Quwo County, Shanxi. One of the tombs was marked as the tomb of Marquis Li of Jin. Quwo County is known to be the site of the ancient capital of the state of Jin.

Monarchs of Jin (Chinese state)
859 BC deaths
9th-century BC Chinese monarchs
Year of birth unknown